Gàidhlig na Lasair is an alternative rock and punk compilation album, by the bands Oi Polloi, Mill a h-Uile Rud, Atomgevitter, Nad Aislingean and The Thing Upstairs. It was released in 2006 by Problem Records.  The album is particularly significant as all of the songs are in Scottish Gaelic, representing musical styles as broad as thrashcore and hip-hop, the first such album of its kind.

Track listing 
 "Carson?" by Oi Polloi
 "'S e Muncaidh a th' annam" by Atomgevitter
 "Òran Sabaid Sabhal Mòr Ostaig" by Mill a h-Uile Rud
 "Pòg a-Rithist Mi" by Nad Aislingean
 "Ramalair Rùisgte" by Oi Polloi
 "Aye Robot" by Atomgevitter
 "Steòrnabhagh" by Mill a h-Uile Rud
 "Saòrsa Do Vanunu" by Oi Polloi
 "Coin Hirt" by Atomgevitter
 "Crath D' Thòn" by Mill a h-Uile Rud
 "Lasair san Adhar" by Nad Aislingean
 "Deiseil 's Deònach" by Oi Polloi
 "Dè a-Nis" by Atomgevitter
 "Nan Soluis Dhubh" by The Thing Upstairs
 "SS Politician" by Oi Polloi

Oi Polloi albums
Mill a h-Uile Rud albums
2006 compilation albums